Donnaha Site is a historic archaeological site located on the banks of the Yadkin River near East Bend, Yadkin County, North Carolina. The site includes well-preserved organic remains from a village occupied between ca. A.D. 1000 and A.D. 1500.

It was listed on the National Register of Historic Places in 1978.

References

Archaeological sites on the National Register of Historic Places in North Carolina
Buildings and structures in Yadkin County, North Carolina
National Register of Historic Places in Yadkin County, North Carolina